The Brussels–Scheldt Maritime Canal (commonly named in various ways including Willebroek Canal and Brussels-Willebroek canal), is a canal in Belgium linking Brussels with the Scheldt river and ultimately the sea. The 28 km long canal has a width of 30 m. and a draught of 2 m., and connects the cities of Brussels and Willebroek, where it joins the Rupel river in the hamlet of Klein-Willebroek. Hence previously the canal was officially known as the Brussels-Rupel Maritime Canal prior to the establishment of a direct link with the Scheldt in 1997.

The canal is one of the oldest navigable canals in Belgium and indeed in Europe.

History
Construction work began in 1550 and lasted until 1561. However, permission to build the canal had already been granted by Philip the Good in 1436. But due to protests from the city of Mechelen (which levied taxes on all transport going through the traditional route via the Zenne river) the project was stalled for a very long time.

In 1531 the Emperor, Charles V renewed the authorization of Philip the Good, but work did not begin immediately. It was not until 1550 that Mary of Hungary (governor of the Netherlands) made an agreement to begin construction. On 16 June 1550 the mayor of Brussels, Jean de Locquenghien gave the ground-breaking ceremony.

The difference in altitude of 14 m between Brussels and the Rupel river at Willebroek was achieved with 4 locks. With the commissioning of the canal, the ships could now avoid navigating the Zenne and being subject to tax in Mechelen.

Soon several basins were built the heart of the city of Brussels, in the St. Catherine area. They were all filled in during the late nineteenth century but are still recognisable today in some of the street names. The course of the canal in Brussels was amended to connect to the Brussels-Charleroi Canal which opened in 1832, thus creating a direct link between the Port of Antwerp and the industrial area of Charleroi.

During the 1920 Summer Olympics, the canal hosted the rowing events.

In 1922 a fully modernised canal was opened to navigation. Now the canal in the Rupel led by a new lock at Wintham. The locks at Vilvoorde and Humbeek were replaced by the Kapelle-op-den-Bos lock. A new upgrade was initiated in 1965, the canal being widened to 55 m (25 m for the locks) and the draught adapted. The construction of two new locks (205 x 25 m) at Zemst (opened in 1975) and Hingene (opened in 1997) allowed the canal to lead directly into the Scheldt. The Port of Brussels is now accessible to ships of 4500 tons and pushed convoys of 9000 tons.

The canal is of paramount importance for the supply of oil to Brussels, which typically represents 30 - 50% of annual traffic. In 1974 the annual traffic rose to 14 million tonnes. After a relapse, the volume transported has been rising again in recent years. With 7 million tons carried by the canal, the Port of Brussels is the second inland port in the country after the Port of Liège.

Following the regionalisation of Belgium, the management of the canal is no longer in the hands of the "SA Maritime" (a company established in 1896) but came under the control of the Port of Brussels for the part in the territory of the Brussels-Capital Region and Waterwegen en Zeekanaal NV for the part in the Flemish Region.

In popular culture

Wannes Van de Velde recorded a song about the bridge of Willebroek named De Brug van Willebroek.

References
This article was largely translated from the French wikipedia article, version 11 May 2008
Sports-reference.com 1920 Summer Olympics rowing website.

Canals opened in 1561
Canals in Brussels
Canals in Flanders
Canals in Antwerp Province
Canals in Flemish Brabant
Venues of the 1920 Summer Olympics
Olympic rowing venues
1561 establishments in the Holy Roman Empire